In Mandaeism, Kiwan or Kiuan is the Mandaic name for the planet Saturn. Kiwan is one of the seven planets, who are part of the entourage of Ruha in the World of Darkness.

Kiwan, who is associated with Saturday as well as Judaism, is also called Br Šamiš (The Son of the Sun). Kiwan's name is derived from the Akkadian Kajamānu.

See also
Kajamanu
Kayvan
Remphan
Ninurta

References

Planets in Mandaeism
Saturn in culture